The Actinobacterial 1 TMS Holin (A-1 Holin) Family (TC# 1.E.32) consists of proteins found in actinobacteria, their conjugative plasmids and their phage. They are usually between 90 and 140 amino acyl residues (aas) in length and exhibit 1 or sometimes even 2 transmembrane segments despite the families name (i.e., TC# 1.E.32.2.1). Although some are annotated as phage proteins or holins, members of the A-1 family are not yet functionally characterized. A representative list of proteins belonging to the A-1 Holin family can be found in the Transporter Classification Database (TCDB).

See also 
 Holin
 Lysin
 Transporter Classification Database

Further reading

References 

Protein families
Membrane proteins
Transmembrane proteins
Transmembrane transporters
Transport proteins
Integral membrane proteins
Holins